The MacArthur Highway, officially the Manila North Road (MNR or MaNor), is a , two-to-six lane, national primary highway and tertiary highway in Luzon, Philippines, connecting Caloocan in Metro Manila to Aparri in Cagayan. It is the second longest road in the Philippines, after Maharlika Highway. It is primarily known as MacArthur Highway in segments from Caloocan to Urdaneta, Pangasinan, although it is also applied up to Ilocos Sur, and likewise called as Manila North Road for the entire length.

Route description

The highway parallels the North Luzon Expressway from Epifanio de los Santos Avenue (EDSA) to Mabalacat, the Subic–Clark–Tarlac Expressway from Mabalacat to Tarlac City, and the Tarlac–Pangasinan–La Union Expressway from Tarlac City to Rosario.

The entire road consists of series of route numbering system by the Department of Public Works and Highways. From Caloocan to Guiguinto and from Laoag to Aparri, it is the component of National Route 1 (N1) of the Philippine highway network, although N1 isn't signposted in the highway; the latter section is also part of the Pan-Philippine Highway or Asian Highway 26 (AH26) of the Asian highway network. The rest of the route from Guiguinto to Laoag is entirely designated as the National Route 2 (N2) of the Philippine highway network. It is also a component of R-9 of Manila's arterial road network. Its remaining section in Aparri is classified as an unnumbered, tertiary road.

Alternative names

Manila North Road's section from Caloocan to Urdaneta, Pangasinan is officially recognized as MacArthur Highway, although it is also known as such in La Union and Ilocos Sur. Its section that forms part of N1/AH26 from Laoag to Aparri is also known as Maharlika Highway and a part of Laoag–Allacapan Road.

Through the city proper of San Fernando, La Union, the road is locally known as Quezon Avenue. In Laoag, it forms part of Laoag–Paoay Road between Laoag Airport Road and at the city proper, it is locally known as J.P. Rizal Avenue and Gen. Segundo Avenue, respectively.

History
The highway was built in sections beginning in 1928 during the American colonial period. It followed much of the route of the old Manila Railroad line from Manila to Dagupan. It was designated Highway 3 and also Route 3 in early U.S. military records. It also reached south up to Manila through the present-day alignment of Rizal Avenue (Route 3A); the highway's section from Caloocan to Valenzuela (formerly Polo) was once part of Rizal Avenue Extension. However, Highway 3 used a different alignment in Valenzuela that exist until today as a mixture of streets in Malanday, in San Fernando, Pampanga as a mixture of streets collectively known as the Old Manila North Road, and in Paniqui as a mixture of streets in the poblacion collectively known as Paniqui Poblacion Road. The highway eventually reached the Ilocos provinces in the north and became known as the Manila North Road. Apparently in the 1950s, it reached further towards Aparri in Cagayan as it took over the section that was previously known as Cagayan-Ilocos Norte Road.

On June 17, 1961, the section of the Manila North Road between Caloocan and Urdaneta alongside the western road to Lingayen which traverses the municipalities of Santa Barbara, Calasiao, Dagupan, and Binmaley in Pangasinan was renamed MacArthur Highway in honor of the Liberator of the Philippines during World War II, General Douglas MacArthur.

Intersections

Metro Manila
  in Caloocan. Southern terminus of the highway.
  in Karuhatan, Valenzuela
  in Malinta, Valenzuela

Bulacan
  in Meycauayan
  in Tabang, Guiguinto. Transition from N1 to N2. Southern terminus of N2.
  in Calumpit

Pampanga
  in San Fernando
  in Angeles
  in Angeles (two northern termini)
  in Angeles
  in Mabiga, Mabalacat
  in Mabalacat
  in Dolores, Mabalacat

Tarlac

  in Capas
  at Tarlac City
  in Santo Cristo, Tarlac City
  in Paniqui (three eastern termini)

Pangasinan
  in Rosales
  in Urdaneta. Official northern end of MacArthur Highway section on Manila North Road.
  in Urdaneta
  in Binalonan
  in Pozzorubio

La Union
  at Camp 1, Rosario
  at Subusub, Rosario
  in Rosario (two southern termini)
  in Agoo
  in Agoo
  at Bauang
  in San Fernando
  in San Fernando

Ilocos Sur

  in Tagudin
  in Candon (northern and southern termini)
  in Narvacan
  in Narvacan
  in Narvacan
  in Bantay
  in Cabugao

Ilocos Norte

  in Currimao
  in Currimao
  in Laoag. Transition from N2 to N1/AH26. Northern terminus of N2.
 in Bacarra

Cagayan
 in Abulug
 in Abulug
  in Aparri. Transition from N1/AH26 to unnumbered tertiary road.

See also
 Pan-Philippine Highway
 Philippine highway network
 List of places named for Douglas MacArthur

References

Roads in Metro Manila
Roads in Bulacan
Roads in Pampanga
Roads in Tarlac
Roads in Pangasinan
Roads in La Union
Roads in Ilocos Sur
Roads in Ilocos Norte
Roads in Cagayan